The head coach is Digit Murphy. Murphy is assisted by Sean Coady and Edith Zimmering.

Offseason
May 22, 2009: Former Brown Bears hockey player, Jodi McKenna, now the women's ice hockey head coach at Wesleyan University, was announced as an assistant coach for the 2010 U.S. Olympic Women's Ice Hockey Team. She joins Mark Johnson, women's ice hockey head coach at the University of Wisconsin, who was previously named the head coach for Team USA through the 2010 Olympic Winter Games in Vancouver.
October 9: The Bears will host the Rhode Island Women's Collegiate Hockey day on October 12 at Meehan Auditorium. The event is a collaboration between the coaches of four collegiate programs. The four programs will be Brown, Providence College, Univ. of Rhode Island, and Salve Regina University.  The coaches will provide local athletes a chance to hone their skills and meet with coaching staffs of successful Rhode Island teams.

Exhibition

Regular season
Oct 24: Digit Murphy recently announced the addition of Jill McInnis to the 2009-2010 women's hockey coaching staff. McInnis, is a 2006 graduate of Boston College, comes from Saint Anselm College, where she was an assistant coach last season.
Feb 26: Former Brown player Becky Kellar was part of the gold medal winning Canadian women's Olympic hockey team. Kellar was the oldest player in the gold medal game.

Standings

Roster

Schedule

Awards and honors
Katie Jamieson, ECAC Defensive Player of the Week (Week of November 16)
Katie Jamieson, 2010 Second Team All-Ivy
Laurie Jolin, ECAC Rookie of the Week (Week of February 22)

References

External links
Official site

Brown Bears women's ice hockey seasons
Brown
Brown
Brown